Reel One Entertainment is a Canadian entertainment company that produces and distributes television movies and  series. It is one of the independent providers of Lifetime (and some Hallmark films) movies. The company was founded in 2001 by Tom Berry, and is headquartered in Montreal.

History 
Reel One was initially founded by Tom Berry under the name “Première Bobine” and registered in Montreal, Quebec, in 2001. Tom Berry was previously CEO of Allegro Films, a Canadian entertainment company, which was sold and integrated into the Groupe Québecor in 1997. Since then, he has produced and executive produced more than 130 movies and TV series in Canada and the United States. Reel One also works with producer Pierre David. Reel One produces on average 100 to 120 television movies a year - including romance, Christmas and thrillers - and original series. In 2012, the company branched into international distribution with its own television movies and established an international office in London to handle distribution outside North America.

In July 2019, French television company Newen agreed to acquire a majority stake in Reel One from Berry. Despite this, Berry would still hold a minority stake in the company. Two years later, Lifetime parent A&E Networks announced it had taken a 35% stake in the company.

Première Bobine 
Première Bobine is the parent company for Reel One Entertainment, Reel One International and Reel One Pictures.

References

External links 
 

Companies based in Montreal
Entertainment companies established in 2001
Television production companies of Canada